The national flag of Ivory Coast is a tricolor flag consisting of equal bands of orange (hoist side), white, and green. The proportions of the flag are 2:3. It is the national emblem of the Republic of Ivory Coast as affirmed in Article 29 of the Constitution of Ivory Coast in 1960.

Design and symbolism
In 1959, when the Ivorian Legislative Assembly adopted the flag, Minister of State  stated:

When presenting the colors of the flag to the 1960 constitutional assembly, commissioner Mamadou Coulibaly said:

 wrote in 1964, "The flag unites the colors of the three great landscapes of the Ivory Coast: green forest, white lagoon and orange savanna."

Adoption
The 1958 referendum replaced the French Fourth Republic with the Fifth Republic and at the same time replaced the French Union with the French Community, under which most colonies became "autonomous states", including Ivory Coast on 4 December 1958. The new status allowed the adoption of a distinctive flag for the first time, in place of the French flag. The French commissioner suggested a red-white-and-blue flag with stars, but Ivorians wanted a greater departure from the flag of the former colonial power. The orange-white-and-green flag was adopted by law number 59-240, passed by the Ivorian Legislative Assembly on 3 December 1959, just before the first anniversary of the country's autonomy.

Head of government Félix Houphouët-Boigny declared full independence from France on 7 August 1960, and the Legislative Assembly sat as a constituent assembly to draft a new constitution. Augustin Loubao proposed changing the orange stripe to red, to symbolize a willingness to shed blood to defend the new republic. Other legislators expressed strong opposition to any change, and the existing flag was retained in Article 1 of the constitution adopted on 3 December 1960. It was retained as Article 29 of the 2000 constitution and Article 48 of the 2016 constitution.

Colors
The three bands of the Ivorian tricolor must have the same width, and the mast is always placed on the orange band side. Although all laws define the colors of the flag, they do not specify the shade, so the bright orange and green colors can be replaced with slightly darker tones depending on the location and circumstances. The L'Album des pavillons nationaux et des marques distinctives (The Album of National Pavilions and Distinguishing Trademarks), the 2000 edition of the Hydrographic and Oceanographic Service of the Navy, indicates that the official colors of the Ivorian flag are orange 151 C and green 347 C. CMYK values for the flag are based on Ivorian government usage. These are a little darker than the Pantone colors which are used by the similar flag of Ireland.

Similar flags

The Irish flag has a similar color layout to the Ivorian one, but with the green on the hoist side and wider proportions (1:2 rather than 2:3). When Murielle Ahouré celebrated winning the 2018 world indoor 60-meter dash, for lack of an Ivorian flag to wave, she borrowed an Irish flag from a spectator and reversed it. Due to this similarity, in Northern Ireland, Ulster loyalists have sometimes desecrated the Ivorian flag, mistaking it for the Irish one. In some cases, Ivorian flags displayed in Northern Ireland have signs explicitly labelling them as such nearby to avoid having them desecrated by Ulster loyalists mistaking them for Irish ones.

The flag of Niger, also adopted in 1959 when Niger and Ivory Coast were both members of the Conseil de l'Entente, is a horizontal tricolor of orange, white and green; as with the Ivorian flag, the orange and green are sometimes said to represent the arid north and the more fertile south respectively.

See also

Coat of arms of Ivory Coast

References

External links

Flags introduced in 1959
Flag
Flags of Africa
National flags
1959 establishments in Ivory Coast